Shazam! was a New Zealand music television programme, which ran for five series, from 1982 to 1987. It was produced by TVNZ, which also produced the similar music show Radio with Pictures.

Shazam! was presented live by hosts including Phillip Schofield.

References 

1982 New Zealand television series debuts
1987 New Zealand television series endings
New Zealand children's television series
1980s New Zealand television series
Pop music television series
English-language television shows
Rock music television series
New Zealand music television series
TVNZ 1 original programming